The glittering pipefish (Halicampus nitidus) is a species of marine coastal fish of the family Syngnathidae. It is secretive and rarely observed. This species is ovoviviparous, with males carrying eggs and giving birth to live young.

Identification

H. nitidus can be recognized by its distinctive zebra-like pattern of dark brown and silvery-white bands that run the length of its body and head.

References

Further reading
IUCN Seahorse, Pipefish & Stickleback Specialist Group
Encyclopedia of Life
WoRMS

Fish described in 1873
Taxa named by Albert Günther
nitidus
Marine fish